Live in Tokyo may refer to:

Albums
 Live in Tokyo, by Miriam Makeba, 1968
 Live in Tokyo (Gary Burton album), 1971
 Live in Tokyo (Weather Report album), 1972
 Live in Tokyo (The Thad Jones/Mel Lewis Orchestra album), 1974
 Live in Tokyo (Charles Tolliver album), 1974
 Live in Tokyo (Barry Harris album), 1976
 Live in Tokyo (Charles McPherson album), 1976
 Live in Tokyo (Jimmy Raney album), 1976
 Live in Tokyo, by Jim Hall, 1976
 Live in Tokyo, by Amazing Blondel, 1977
 Live in Tokyo (Wishbone Ash album), 1979
 Live In Tokyo (Public Image Limited album), 1983
 Live in Tokyo, by Psychic TV, 1986
 Live in Tokyo, by Shellac, 1994
 Live in Tokyo (Hughes Turner Project album), 2002
 Live in Tokyo (Brad Mehldau album), 2004
 Live in Tokyo 25th November 2005, by Underworld, 2005
 Live in Tokyo, by Swing Out Sister, 2005
 Live in Tokyo (Stevie Ray Vaughan album), 2006
 Live in Tokyo, by Fazıl Say, 2006
 Cha Cha 2000 - Live in Tokyo 1996 Vol. 1, by La! Neu?, 1998
 G3: Live in Tokyo, 2005
 Live in Tokyo 1996 Vol. 2, by La! Neu?, 1999
 Man-Tora! Live in Tokyo, by the Manhattan Transfer, 1996

Videos
 Images and Words: Live in Tokyo, by Dream Theater, 1993
 Live in Tokyo, by Queensrÿche, 1985